Tebay may refer to:

In geography
 Tebay, village and civil parish in Cumbria, England 
 Tebay River, Alaska, US

In people
 Charlotte Tebay, English philatelist, born c. 1819
 Henry Tebay, English cricketer with Sussex, born 1866
 Kevan Tebay, English cricketer with Lancashire, born 1936